The Korean snake eel (Pisodonophis sangjuensis) is an eel in the family Ophichthidae (worm/snake eels). It was described by Hwan-Sung Ji and Jin-Koo Kim in 2011. It is a marine, temperate water-dwelling eel which is known from Korea, in the northwestern Pacific Ocean.

The species epithet "sangjuensis" refers to the Korean snake eel's type locality, in Sangju.

References

Ophichthidae
Fish described in 2011